The Orlando Rage was an American football team based in Orlando, Florida as part of the XFL, begun by Vince McMahon of the World Wrestling Federation and by NBC, a major television network in the United States.

History

The team's colors were scarlet, yellow, navy blue and white with jersey numbers in a unique jagged font. They played their home games at Orlando's Florida Citrus Bowl, which was configured so that the upper deck was closed off and all fans were seated in the lower bowl to give a better appearance for television (a move that was effective, as the Rage had one of the stronger fan bases in the league, with average attendance at over two-thirds of the lower bowl's capacity; the team sold out all 36,000 lower bowl seats for its home opener). The team's General Manager was Tom Veit a former Major League Soccer Vice-president and were coached by former Florida Gators head coach Galen Hall. They were in the XFL's Eastern Division with the NY/NJ Hitmen, Chicago Enforcers and Birmingham Thunderbolts.

The Rage were one of the two teams who opted not to don nicknames on the back of their jerseys. In the Rage's case, the decision was made by a majority vote of the players (despite the objections of starting quarterback Jeff Brohm, who openly embraced the XFL's approach to sports entertainment and wanted to wear "J Bro" on his jersey).

Jeff Brohm, at the time also under contract to the Cleveland Browns, was the quarterback of the Rage for most of the regular season, amassing a 6–0 record as starter during his first time at the helm.  The team looked to be the league's powerhouse franchise under Brohm and was on pace for a perfect season (coincidentally, Orlando's next professional football team, the Florida Tuskers, would also win their first six games in a row before losing the seventh). He showed his toughness after he suffered an injury from a devastating hit by at the hands of Memphis Maniax defensive end Shante Carver in Week 5.  Despite suffering a concussion in the hit and doctors' advice not to play, Brohm came back a week later against Las Vegas, giving a rousing speech stating that he was returning because it was the XFL and he still had a pulse. The following week he suffered a shoulder injury against the Los Angeles Xtreme and his season (and playing career) was done for good. It led to him being replaced by Brian Kuklick after six games. While Kuklick filled in the role of quarterback acceptably, the team lost a valuable leader on offense. The team went 2–2 in Kuklick's care; Kuklick, despite only starting four games, led the league in interceptions with 10.

The team finished their only regular season with an 8–2 record, the best in the league, but were upset in the first round of the playoffs by the 5–5 San Francisco Demons. Orlando had an early 16–0 advantage but allowed San Francisco to pull ahead and take a 26–16 lead by the fourth quarter. Using the XFL's newly introduced three-point conversion rule on a subsequent touchdown, the Rage got within one point but the Demons successfully ran out the clock and won 26–25. San Francisco would go on to lose the XFL Championship Game versus Los Angeles 38–6. Many in the league were disappointed, hoping for a match-up against the two division champions. NBC dropped the XFL after the first season (2001) due to dismal ratings, and the league folded soon afterward.

XFL returns to Florida

In December 2018, the revival of the XFL announced that it would return to Florida. The league was exploring relocating the Vipers to Orlando shortly before the league suspended operations and went bankrupt in April 2020. In 2022, the league, under new ownership, announced that the New York Guardians would relocate to Orlando as the Orlando Guardians. The team took the field on February 18, 2023.

Season-by-season

|-
|2001 || 8 || 2 || 0 || 1st Eastern || Lost Semifinals (San Francisco)
|-
!Totals || 8 || 3 || 0
|colspan="2"| (including playoffs)

Schedule

Regular season

Post-season

Personnel

Staff

Source:

Roster

Standings

Source:

Statistical leaders
 Rushing yards: 387, Derrick Clark
 Receiving yards: 659, Dialleo Burks
 Passing yards: 998, Brian Kuklick

Awards and honors

Awards

Honors

References

 
XFL (2001) teams
2001 establishments in Florida
2001 disestablishments in Florida